The discography of Idlewild, a Scottish rock band, consists of eight studio albums, three EPs, three compilations, one live album, and twenty-eight singles.

Studio albums

 1 Often considered to be a mini-album.
 2 Charted at number 2 on the UK Indie Chart.
 3 Initially self-released to fans on 11 June through idlewildmusic.com.
 4 Pre-orders through Pledge Music announced on 3 November 2014.

EPs

Compilation albums

 1 Download-only.

Live albums

Singles

Notes
 A ^Chart ineligible.

Other appearances
 1998 – Gran Turismo – "A Film for the Future"
 2003 – FIFA 2003 – "You Held the World in Your Arms"
 2005 – Midnight Club 3: DUB Edition – "A Modern Way of Letting Go"
 2006 – Saints Row – "Too Long Awake"
 2007 – Ballads of the Book – "The Weight of Years"

References

Discographies of British artists
Rock music group discographies